''The Ngong Road Forest covers an area approximately three and a half times the size of New York City’s Central Park. It is divided into two main sectors by the Ngong Road: the Miotoni Section to the North West, and the Racecourse and Kibera section to the South East. The Southern Bypass, which is currently under construction, in turn divides these sections.

The forest was originally gazetted in 1932, it covered an area of approximately 2,926.6 hectares and supplied the railways with timber and fuel. By 1978, this area had been reduced after a series of legal excisions. Illegal land grabbing was also rife with portions of the forest split off and allocated to private developers behind closed doors. In the early 1990s, the Trustees of Ngong Road Forest Sanctuary, led by Imre Loefler discovered that the core of the indigenous forest had been divided in to 35 land parcels and was to be given over to developers. After intense lobbying of the government, the sell-off was cancelled. By 2005, the total area of the Ngong Road Forest had reached its current size of 1,224 hectares.

The Forest Act of 2005

Since 2005 and the passing of The Forest Act, the Ngong Road Forest has been managed by the Kenya Forest Service. The 2005 Act was in part inspired by the rescue of the Karura Forest, reflecting a broader recognition of the importance of urban forest rehabilitation.

The Forest Act encourages the involvement of neighbouring communities in forest management, contrary to past practices which saw the centralisation of management. This is in line with the approach of countries around the world and a collaborative approach is now widely regarded as the optimum way of managing natural resources. The plan for rehabilitating the Ngong Road Forest has local community involvement at its core.

Ngong Forest, which extends to Rift Valley Province, has undergone deforestation due to the settlement of Karen and Ngong, as well as to the development of the Lenana School and the Ngong Racecourse. These events have reduced Ngong Forest's original  to the current .

References
www.ngongroadforest.com

Forests of Kenya
Nairobi